Yevgeny Mikhailovich Golubovsky (born December 5, 1936, Odessa) is a Soviet and Ukrainian journalist and culturologist.

Born in Odessa on December 5, 1936. He graduated from the Odessa Polytechnic Institute, where in 1956 he arranged a debate evening with his friends on art  from impressionism to cubism, which was perceived by the authorities as an action against the official art of socialist realism. Only the intervention of Ilya Ehrenburg and Boris Polevoy saved him from being expelled from the institute.

After working for several years as an engineer, he went into journalism related to the culture and history of Odessa. Published in magazines in Russia, Ukraine, USA, Israel. Member of the National Union of Journalists of Ukraine.

He became the Honorary Citizen of Odesa (september of 2022).

Bibliography 
 Field —  Ehrenburg. From correspondence (1986)
Black Square over the Black Sea: Materials for the History of the Avant-garde art of Odessa. XX century (with Tatiana Shchurova and Olga Botushanskaya; 2001)
 Yuri Egorov's sea (2005)
 Loyalty to the Odessa  Brotherhood (2012)
 True Poetic Nobility (2014)
 Karakis's City Guide (2016)
 Looking from Bolshaya Arnautskaya (2016)

References

External links 
 Евгений Голубовский и все, все, все...

1936 births
Living people
Writers from Odesa
Soviet journalists
20th-century Ukrainian journalists
21st-century Ukrainian journalists
Ukrainian journalists
Ukrainian editors
20th-century male writers
21st-century male writers
Soviet male writers
Ukrainian male writers
Ukrainian art historians
Ukrainian Soviet Socialist Republic people